American singer Gwen Stefani has recorded material for four studio albums and one extended play (EP), and has been featured on songs on other artists' respective albums. After releasing five studio albums with ska punk group No Doubt, in 2004 Stefani began work as a solo artist, developing her pop debut Love. Angel. Music. Baby. in the same year. It produced several top ten singles worldwide, including "What You Waiting For?", "Rich Girl", and "Hollaback Girl", the latter of which was the first single to sell over a million digital copies in the United States. The record contained work from a variety of producers and songwriters, including Linda Perry, Nellee Hooper, André 3000, and No Doubt bandmate Tony Kanal. "Cool", "Luxurious", and "Crash" were also released as the singles. In 2005, Stefani released an extended play, Love. Angel. Music. Baby. (The Remixes), which included the Richard X remix of "Cool", which topped the United States Dance Club Songs in November 2005. Hip hop musician André 3000 made two appearances on the album, including on "Long Way to Go", and his alter ego "Johnny Vulture" on "Bubble Pop Electric".

Following the release of Love. Angel. Music. Baby., Stefani decided to release a studio album containing a mixture of leftover tracks and newly recorded ones, titled The Sweet Escape (2006). The record featured Stefani rapping on several tracks, but also contained the dance-pop genre that was explored on Love. Angel. Music. Baby.. It yielded two more top ten singles, "Wind it Up" and "The Sweet Escape", both released in 2006; the latter track became the singer's second single to reach number two on the Billboard Hot 100, following her collaboration "Let Me Blow Ya Mind" with Eve in 2001. Themes from the record include fashion, in addition to romantic situations and details of her career and personal life. Stefani took a hiatus from her solo career to continue work on a sixth studio album with No Doubt, Push and Shove, which was released in late 2012. A line of non-album singles was released following the aforementioned record, including "Baby Don't Lie" and "Spark the Fire", both released in 2014. Stefani's third album This Is What the Truth Feels Like, was released on March 18, 2016, included the singles "Used to Love You", "Make Me Like You", and "Misery". Unlike her previous work, the record dealt with her divorce and "falling in love again". American rapper Fetty Wap appears on album track "Asking 4 It", which was produced by Stargate. You Make It Feel Like Christmas, Stefani's 2017 Christmas album is a mix of six classic holiday songs and six brand new tracks. It was fronted by lead single "You Make It Feel Like Christmas".

The singer has also recorded songs for film soundtracks, including a verse for a collaboration with rapper Eminem: "Kings Never Die" from Southpaw and "Shine" for Paddington. In September 2016, Stefani appeared on Trolls: Original Motion Picture Soundtrack, contributing to "Hair Up", "What U Workin' With?", and three other ensembles with Justin Timberlake.

Songs

References

External links 
Gwen Stefani songwriting details at the American Society of Composers, Authors and Publishers (ASCAP)

 
Stefani, Gwen